Lists of Atlantic hurricanes, or tropical cyclones in the Atlantic Ocean, are organized by the properties of the hurricane or by the location most affected.

By property

List of Atlantic hurricane seasons
List of Atlantic hurricane records
List of Category 1 Atlantic hurricanes
List of Category 2 Atlantic hurricanes
List of Category 3 Atlantic hurricanes
List of Category 4 Atlantic hurricanes
List of Category 5 Atlantic hurricanes
List of costliest Atlantic hurricanes
List of deadliest Atlantic hurricanes
List of off-season Atlantic hurricanes
List of retired Atlantic hurricane names
List of tropical cyclone-spawned tornadoes
List of wettest tropical cyclones
List of wettest tropical cyclones by country
List of wettest tropical cyclones in the United States

By location
List of Atlantic–Pacific crossover hurricanes
List of Azores hurricanes
Hurricanes in the Bahama Archipelago
List of Baja California Peninsula hurricanes
List of Barbados hurricanes
List of Bermuda hurricanes
List of Canada hurricanes
List of Newfoundland hurricanes
List of Cayman Islands hurricanes
List of Cuba hurricanes
List of Hispaniola hurricanes
List of Jamaica hurricanes
List of South America hurricanes
Hurricanes in the Virgin Islands
List of West Africa hurricanes
South Atlantic tropical cyclone
Tropical cyclone effects in Europe

United States
List of United States hurricanes

List of Alabama hurricanes
List of Arizona hurricanes
List of California hurricanes
List of Delaware hurricanes
List of Florida hurricanes
List of Florida hurricanes (pre-1900)
List of Florida hurricanes (1900–1949)
List of Florida hurricanes (1950–1974)
List of Florida hurricanes (1975–1999)
List of Florida hurricanes (2000–present)
List of Georgia hurricanes
List of Hawaii hurricanes
List of Louisiana hurricanes (2000–present)
List of Maryland hurricanes (1950–present)
List of New England hurricanes
List of New Jersey hurricanes
List of New Mexico hurricanes
List of New York hurricanes
List of North Carolina hurricanes
List of North Carolina hurricanes (pre-1900)
List of North Carolina hurricanes (1900–1949)
List of North Carolina hurricanes (1950–1979)
List of North Carolina hurricanes (1980–1999)
List of North Carolina hurricanes (2000–present)
List of Pennsylvania hurricanes
List of Texas hurricanes
List of Texas hurricanes (pre–1900)
List of Texas hurricanes (1900–1949)
List of Texas hurricanes (1950–1979)
List of Texas hurricanes (1980–present)

See also
List of tropical cyclones
List of Pacific hurricanes